Rhamnus alnifolia is a species of flowering plant in the buckthorn family known by the common names alderleaf buckthorn, or alder buckthorn. Unlike other "buckthorns", this alder buckthorn does not have thorns. It is native to North America, where it is known mainly from the southern half of Canada and the northern half of the United States and California. It can be found in forested habitat.

Description
The inflorescence is a solitary flower or umbel of up to three flowers occurring in leaf axils. The drupes darken to black when ripe.

Uses
Native Americans used the species as a laxative.

References

External links
 

alnifolia
Flora of Canada
Flora of the Northern United States
Flora of the Great Lakes region (North America)
Flora of the Northwestern United States
Flora of California
Flora of Utah
Flora of the Appalachian Mountains
Flora of the Rocky Mountains
Flora of the Sierra Nevada (United States)
Flora of the Northeastern United States
Flora without expected TNC conservation status